McKinney v. Arizona, 589 U.S. ___ (2020), is a Supreme Court of the United States decision concerning how an appellate court handles sentencing after an Edding's error is identified – an error in which a person deciding a sentence in a capital punishment does not consider all mitigating evidence. It ruled that the state appellate court, rather than a jury, should reweigh the mitigating and aggravating factors in a habeas corpus review.

Background 
James Erin McKinney (born June 4, 1967), along with his half-brother Charles Michael Hedlund (born November 22, 1964), committed two counts of burglary which resulted in two deaths.  After being prosecuted by the State of Arizona, McKinney was found guilty of two counts of First Degree Murder. At sentencing, a psychologist testified that he had diagnosed McKinney with post-traumatic stress disorder, with the sentencing judge stating that McKinney's childhood was  “beyond the comprehension of most people.”  Arizona state law prevented the judge from considering this as it had no direct relevance to the crime and McKinney was thus sentenced to death.

On appeal in 2018, the Arizona Supreme Court upheld the death sentence. It was then appealed to the United States Supreme Court  over disagreements on whether a judge or jury should resentence the defendant. As of April 2021, both McKinney and Hedlund are among 20 Arizona death row inmates who have exhausted all their appeals.

Decision 
The Court ruled 5–4 that the state appellate court may reweigh the aggravating and mitigating factors.

See also 
 Eddings v. Oklahoma, 455 U.S. 104 (1982)

References 

2020 in United States case law
United States Supreme Court cases of the Roberts Court
United States Supreme Court cases
United States death penalty case law